Bryan Jamaile Fletcher (born March 23, 1979) is a former American football tight end. He played college football for UCLA, and was drafted in the 6th round of the 2002 NFL Draft by the Chicago Bears. Fletcher won Super Bowl XLI with the Indianapolis Colts over the Bears.

Bryan graduated from the University of California, Los Angeles in 2001 with a Bachelor of Arts degree in English and later received a Master of Business Administration in Finance from The Kelley School of Business at Indiana University. After college, Bryan spent several years in the National Football League where his career culminated in the 2006 Super Bowl championship with the Indianapolis Colts organization. During his time with the Colts, Bryan was very active in the community, donating his time visiting local schools and hospitals engaging in uplifting discussions and sharing his life experiences. With a mindset on public service, Bryan also participated in one of the first international internships ever for an NFL player with his service at The U.S. Embassy in Madrid, Spain and with NFL Mexico. Fluent in Spanish, Bryan continues to seek opportunities to impact the lives of youth within the U.S. and Mexico.

He spent much of his post-professional football career in the financial industry. Most recently, Bryan worked in Manhattan, New York  where he was responsible for managing a portfolio of high net-worth clients. During his tenure, he was instrumental in introducing an innovative coverage strategy that allowed the firm to more efficiently meet the needs of a broad array of clients.  His initiative and innovative thinking quickly positioned Bryan as a leader amongst his peers and led to him being chosen to participate in the “Step Up To Lead” program for future leaders within the company.

Currently, Bryan is an active volunteer within the San Diego community and serves on the San Diego County Civil Service Commission.

College years
Fletcher attended UCLA and was a letterman in football. He finished his career with 30 receptions for 423 yards (14.1 yards per reception average) and three touchdowns, and as a senior, he was an All-Pacific-10 Conference second-team selection and won the UCLA Best Leadership Award.

Professional career
Fletcher was drafted in the sixth round of the 2002 NFL Draft. In the three years with the Colts, he had 54 catches for 547 yards and 5 touchdowns. After the 2008 NFL Draft he was waived by the Colts.

Bryan Fletcher – receiving statistics

Personal life
He is the younger brother of former San Diego Chargers running back Terrell Fletcher and older brother of Shaun Fletcher, former student-athlete and current Professor at San Jose State University.

References

1979 births
Living people
Players of American football from St. Louis
African-American players of American football
American football tight ends
UCLA Bruins football players
Chicago Bears players
Indianapolis Colts players
2020 United States presidential electors
California Democrats
21st-century African-American politicians
21st-century American politicians
20th-century African-American sportspeople